= Mercedes-Benz Vision Iconic =

Mercedes Vision Iconic

Overview
- Designer: Gorden Wagener

The Mercedes-Benz Vision Iconic is a concept grand-touring coupe unveiled by Mercedes‑Benz in October 2025.
